Ōsumi can stand for:

Ōsumi Province, a former province of Japan
Ōsumi Peninsula
Ōsumi Islands, an archipelago at the northern end of the Ryukyu Islands
Ōsumi (satellite), the first Japanese satellite
Ōsumi class LST, a class of Japanese amphibious transport dock

People with the surname
Masaaki Ōsumi (born 1934), Japanese anime director
Baron Mineo Ōsumi, a Japanese admiral
Paul Osumi, a Japanese Christian minister
Yoshinori Ohsumi, Japanese cell biologist and 2016 Nobel laureate in Physiology or Medicine

Japanese-language surnames